Šubířov is a municipality and village in Prostějov District in the Olomouc Region of the Czech Republic. It has about 300 inhabitants.

Administrative parts
The village of Chobyně is an administrative part of Šubířov.

References

Villages in Prostějov District